Kavell Chevano Bigby-Williams (born 7 October 1995) is a British professional basketball player who last played for the Fort Wayne Mad Ants of the NBA G League. He was named NABC NJCAA Player of the Year as a sophomore at Gillette College in 2016, before playing college basketball for the Oregon Ducks and the LSU Tigers.

Early life
Bigby-Williams grew up playing soccer in East London. He was a 6'6 goalkeeper at the age of 15 when he broke his leg. After recovering from his injury, he turned his attention to basketball  and quickly mastered the fundamentals. As a senior at Harris Academy Beckenham, he averaged 20.7 points, 15.4 rebounds and 6 blocks per game. He committed to play college basketball at Montana State but failed to qualify academically, so he instead ended up at Gillette College in Wyoming.

College career
As a freshman, Bigby-Williams averaged 10.1 points and 9.6 rebounds per game. As a sophomore at Gillette, Bigby-Williams averaged 16.8 points, 13.6 rebounds and 5.6 blocks per game. He was named NABC NJCAA Player of the Year. Bigby-Williams was the top-ranked junior college prospect and signed with Oregon in April 2016.

As a junior, Bigby-Williams averaged 3 points and 2.8 rebounds per game. He received more playing time after Chris Boucher was injured in the Pac-12 Tournament. In the NCAA Tournament, he averaged 2.2 points and 2.4 rebounds per game to help Oregon reach the Final Four. Following the season, he opted to transfer to LSU. After posting 14 points, 10 rebounds, five blocks and a steal in a 83-69 victory at Ole Miss, followed by 12 points and 11 rebounds in an 89-67 win against South Carolina, Bigby-Williams was named SEC player of the week on 21 January 2019. As a senior, he averaged 7.9 points, 6.7 rebounds, and 1.9 blocks per game.

Professional career

NBA G League
After going undrafted in the 2019 NBA draft, Bigby-Williams was signed by the Charlotte Hornets but quickly released, instead joining the New Orleans Pelicans. Bigby-Williams was signed by the Pelicans on 6 August 2019 to an Exhibit 10 contract. After playing in one preseason game, he was waived on 19 October. He joined their affiliate in the NBA G League, the Erie BayHawks. On 10 January 2020, Bigby-Williams missed a game with an undisclosed injury. He posted 18 points, 12 rebounds, six blocks, one assist and one steal in a loss to the Iowa Wolves on 23 January. Bigby-Williams averaged 8.5 points, 9.2 rebounds and 2.1 blocks per game in 25 games.

On 4 February, he was traded to the Sioux Falls Skyforce in exchange for Raphiael Putney. On 27 February, Bigby-Williams was traded to the Fort Wayne Mad Ants in exchange for a 2020 2nd round pick and the rights of Isaiah Hartenstein.

Europe
On December 14, 2020, he signed with Pallacanestro Cantù of the Lega Basket Serie A. On March 11, 2021, Bigby-Williams left Cantù and moved to Belgium in the Pro Basketball League, signing with the Antwerp Giants. On August 19, 2021, he signed with Anwil Włocławek of the Polish Basketball League.

Return to the G League
On February 1, 2022, Bigby-Williams was re-acquired by the Fort Wayne Mad Ants of the NBA G League through his returning player rights.

National team career
Bigby-Williams represented Great Britain in its Under-20 and Under-18 teams, averaging 8.9 points, 7.3 rebounds and 1.4 blocks per game between the two squads.

References

External links
LSU Tigers bio
Oregon Ducks bio

1995 births
Living people
Antwerp Giants players
British expatriate basketball people in Belgium
British expatriate basketball people in Italy
British expatriate basketball people in the United States
British men's basketball players
Erie BayHawks (2019–2021) players
Fort Wayne Mad Ants players
Junior college men's basketball players in the United States
KK Włocławek players
LSU Tigers basketball players
Oregon Ducks men's basketball players
Pallacanestro Cantù players
Power forwards (basketball)
Sioux Falls Skyforce players
Basketball players from Greater London
Black British sportspeople